Block is an unincorporated community in Champaign County, Illinois, United States. Block is located along the Union Pacific railroad line northeast of Villa Grove. Block (also known locally as Block Station) was created in 1903-1904 when the Chicago and Eastern Illinois Railroad (under control of the Frisco) built a line from Villa Grove to Woodland. The community was named after the landowner who plotted out the village.

The village contained a railroad depot, grain elevator, and a grocery store (that operated until the late 1950s/early 1960s. The grocery has since been converted into apartments.

References

Unincorporated communities in Champaign County, Illinois
Unincorporated communities in Illinois